Purutu Island is the second largest island in the Fly River delta, Papua New Guinea, after Kiwai Island. Its area is 186 km2.

Administratively, the island belongs to Kiwai Rural LLG in South Fly District of Western Province.

Fly River
Islands of Papua New Guinea
Western Province (Papua New Guinea)